Franz Karl Movers (July 17, 1806 – September 28, 1856), German Roman Catholic divine and Orientalist, was born at Koesfeld in Westphalia.

Life
He studied theology and Oriental languages at Münster, was parish priest at Berkum near Bonn from 1833 to 1839, and professor of Old Testament theology in the Catholic faculty at Breslau from 1839 to his death.

His elaborate works, Die Phönizier (1841–1850) and Phönizische Texte, erklärt (1845–1847), attained a high reputation. 
Of his other writings two biblical studies were of some importance, his Kritische Untersuchungen caber die alttestamentliche Chronik (1834), and his Latin essay on the two recensions of the text of Jeremiah, De utriusque recensionis vaticiniorum Jeremiae ... indole et origine (1837)

References

Attribution:

1806 births
1856 deaths
19th-century German Catholic theologians
German orientalists
19th-century German male writers
19th-century German writers
German male non-fiction writers